The Daasanach (also known as the Marille or Geleba) are a Cushitic ethnic group inhabiting parts of Ethiopia, Kenya, and South Sudan. Their main homeland is in the Debub Omo Zone of the Southern Nations, Nationalities, and People's Region, adjacent to Lake Turkana. According to the 2007 national census, they number 48,067 people (or 0.07% of the total population of Ethiopia), of whom 1,481 are urban dwellers.

History
The Daasanach are also called Marille especially by their neighbours, the Turkana of Kenya. The Daasanach are traditionally pastoralists, but in recent years have become primarily agropastoral. Having lost the majority of their lands over the past fifty years or so, primarily as a result from being excluded from their traditional Kenyan lands, including on both sides of Lake Turkana, and the 'Ilemi Triangle' of Sudan, they have suffered a massive decrease in the numbers of cattle, goats and sheep.  As a result, large numbers of them have moved to areas closer to the Omo River, where they attempt to grow enough crops to survive.  There is much disease along the river (including tsetse, which has increased with forest and woodland development there), however, making this solution to their economic plight difficult.  Like many pastoral peoples throughout this region of Africa, the Daasanach are a highly egalitarian society, with a social system involving age sets and clan lineages - both of which involve strong reciprocity relations.

Language
The Daasanach today speak the Daasanach language. It belongs to the Cushitic branch of the Afro-Asiatic family. The language is notable for its large number of noun classes, irregular verb system, and implosive consonants. For instance, the initial D in Daasanach is implosive, sometimes written as 'D.

Genetics
Modern genetic analysis of the Daasanach indicates that they are more closely related to Nilo-Saharan and Niger-Congo-speaking populations inhabiting Tanzania than they are to the Cushitic and Semitic Afro-Asiatic-speaking populations of Ethiopia. This suggests that the Daasanach were originally Nilo-Saharan speakers, sharing common origins with the Pokot. In the 19th century, the Nilotic ancestors of these two populations are believed to have begun separate migrations, with one group heading southwards into the African Great Lakes region and the other group settling in southern Ethiopia. There, the early Daasanach Nilotes would have come into contact with a Cushitic-speaking population, and eventually adopted this group's Afro-Asiatic language.

Daily life

The Daasanach are a primarily agropastoral people; they grow sorghum, maize, pumpkins and beans when the Omo river and its delta floods. Otherwise the Daasanach rely on their goats and cattle which give them milk, and are slaughtered in the dry season for meat and hides. Sorghum is cooked with water into a porridge eaten with a stew. Corn is usually roasted, and sorghum is fermented into beer. The Daasanach who herd cattle live in dome-shaped houses made from a frame of branches, covered with hides and woven boxes (which are used to carry possessions on donkeys when the Daasanach migrate). The huts have a hearth, with mats covering the floor used for sleeping. The Dies, or lower class, are people who have lost their cattle and their way of living. They live on the shores of Lake Turkana hunting crocodiles and fishing. Although their status is low because of their lack of cattle, the Dies help the herders with crocodile meat and fish in return for meat.

Women are circumcised by removing the clitoris. Women who are not circumcised are called animals or boys and cannot get married or wear clothes.  Women wear a pleated cowskin skirt and necklaces and bracelets, they are usually married off at 17 while men are at 20. Boys are circumcised. Men wear only a checkered cloth around their waist.

Media coverage
There are a number of variant spellings of Daasanach, including Dasenach and Dassanech (the latter used in an episode about them in the TV series Tribe). Daasanach is the primary name given in the Ethnologue language entry.

See also
El Molo people
Arbore people
Western Omo–Tana languages

Further reading 
 Uri Almagor, "Institutionalizing a fringe periphery: Dassanetch-Amhara relations", pp. 96–115 in The Southern Marches of Imperial Ethiopia (ed. Donald L. Donham and Wendy James), Oxford: James Currey, 2002.
 Claudia J. Carr, Pastoralism in Crisis:  the Dassanetch of Southwest Ethiopia.  University of Chicago.  1977.

References 

Ethnic groups in Ethiopia
Ethnic groups in Kenya
Ethnic groups in Sudan
Cushitic-speaking peoples